The Holy Way came about as a result of the canonization of Bishop Benno of Meissen. It led from Bohemia to Meissen and ran between Grillenburg and Wilsdruff in the present-day district of Sächsische Schweiz-Osterzgebirge in the opposite direction and parallel with the Saxon St. James' Way (Sächsischen Jakobsweg). Original sections of the route have survived, for example in the Tharandt Forest between Grillenburg and Spechtshausen.

Sources 
 Kurt Osk. Lehm: Aus Vergangenheit und Gegenwart der bei Tharandt gelegenen Orte Hartha, Grillenburg, Fördergersdorf, Hintergersdorf, Spechtshausen und Porsdorf, Selbstverlag des Verfassers, 1904
 Walter Bachmann: Grillenburg, Mitteilungen des Landesvereines Sächsischer Heimatschutz, Heft 5-8, Band XXV, Dresden, 1936
 Kulturbund der DDR, Ortsgruppe Tharandt (pub.): Der Tharandter Wald, Forststadt Tharandt, Beiträge zur Heimatgeschichte, Heft 7, Tharandt, 1982
 Heinz Weise (ed.): Mark Meißen, F.A. Brockhaus Verlag, Leipzig, 1st ed., 1989
 Heinrich Magirius, Norbert Oelsner, Reinhard Spehr: Grillenburg, Landesamt für Denkmalpflege Sachsen, Arbeitsheft 10, Dresden, 2006,

Literature 
 Renate Rettig: Der Jakobspilgerweg im Tharandter Wald..., Förderverein Gästeführer Tharandter Wald-Osterzgebirge e.V. (Hrsg.), Kurort Hartha 2010
 Historischer Pilger- und Jagdweg im Tharandter Wald, André Kaiser
 Stephan Klingbeil: Pilgerpfade sollen Tourismus ankurbeln, Sächsische Zeitung Freital, 9. Februar 2011, p. 14
 Peter Hertel: Die Muschel weist Pilgern den Weg, Freie Presse Freiberg, 2. Juli 2011, ;. 10
 Peter Hertel: Wanderer wandeln auf heiligem Weg, Freie Presse Freiberg, 5. Juli 2011
 Iris Schmidt: Im Sinne der Muschel pilgern, Freitaler Wochenkurier, 20. Juli 2011, p. 2
 Ines Klein: Auf dem Weg zu sich selbst, Sächsische Zeitung Freital, 26. Juli 2011, p. 14
 Astrid Ring: Auf dem Pilgerweg ins Böhmische, Freie Presse Freiberg, 26. August 2011

External links
 Ökumenischer Pilgerweg im Zuge der Via Regia in Saxony and Thuringia
 Weg der Jakobspilger im Zuge der Frankenstraße in Saxony
 Ziel 3-Projekt Wander- und Pilgerweg HGV Rechenberg-Bienenmühle e.V.

Pilgrimage routes
Tharandt